Lampton School is a secondary school and sixth form with academy status located in Hounslow, west London, England.

Admissions
Lampton is a Leading Edge school, and is a training school which currently has around 1,358 students on roll. Lampton borders the A4 (Great West Road) in Hounslow, and is next to Lampton Park. This is about one mile west of Spring Grove, and a mile south of the M4 near Heston. Osterley Park is a mile to the north-east. Its ethnic mix reflects that of the local area, with most students being of South Asian heritage. The school has a wide range of ethnicities, including white British, Polish, and many more from across the world. Around 30% of students receive free school meals.

Lampton also offers a 6th Form for pupils aged 16 and over, which takes the majority of its intake from Lampton GCSE students, but is also open to applicants from outside the school. The headteacher is Stephen Davis. He was preceded by Sue John, also known as Dame Susan Elizabeth John (born 1953), who was knighted in 2012 for her service to education.

Dame Sue John was later succeeded by Stephen Davis, who has been the Headteacher of Lampton School since then.

History
Lampton School used to be known as Spring Grove Grammar School, a grammar school before being converted to a comprehensive. The school gained its Humanities Specialist status in 2003, a designation which enabled the building of the Language and Learning Zone (LLZ), a multi-media and Information and communication technologies suite situated at the western end of the Spring Grove building.

In recent years an ultra-modern Sixth Form Block resembling a barn was constructed on what used to be a hockey gravel pit.

Murder of Lynne Weedon

 
One of Britain's most high-profile unsolved murders occurred outside the school in September 1975. At approximately 11:20pm on the evening of 3 September 1975, a 16-year-old schoolgirl named Lynne Weedon was hit over the head with a blunt object by an unidentified attacker in the 'School Walk' alleyway (also known as the 'Short Hedges'), which provides access to the school from the Great West Road. The attacker then lifted her over gates and into the power substation next to the school, where he then raped her. She was discovered there the next day by the caretaker of the school, Victor Voice, and despite having a fractured skull was still alive, although she died in hospital several days later without regaining consciousness. The killer has never been identified but in 2007 it was discovered through analysis of DNA samples left by the attacker that he had also killed another woman on the other side of London in 1975, Playboy Club Bunny Eve Stratford. Police are still trying to identify the murderer, and a £40,000 reward remains on offer for his capture. A man had been seen walking into the alleyway just before Weddon was attacked that night, and detectives believe this individual was her killer. When Weedon's murder featured on Crimewatch in 2007 and 2015, detectives stated that her murderer would have been between 17 and 30 (between 62 and 76 in 2022), would have lived in or been linked to Hounslow, may have gone to prison between 1975 and 1995 (the year in which DNA began to be taken from people arrested of crime), and would have specific knowledge of the area of the school and alleyway.  
 
The site of Weedon's murder remains largely unchanged today. The electricity sub-station where she was found remains next to the School Walk alleyway, as does the original fence she was thrown over by her attacker.

Academic performance
The last OFSTED inspection, in 2012, found the school to be "outstanding". In 2009 Ofsted highlighted Lampton as one of 12 outstanding schools serving disadvantaged communities. Its Progress 8 score in 2022 was above average at 0.94, putting it 73rd in the country.

Prime Minister's Global Fellowship
The school has a good record of students attaining places on the Prime Minister's Global Fellowship programme. The school achieved its first student in the inaugural year of the programme, 2008, and in 2009 had two more successful applicants.

Notable former pupils
 Hammasa Kohistani, Miss England 2005
 Owais Shah, cricketer
 Steven Caulker, professional footballer
 Carlton Cole, professional footballer
Mark Strippel, (also known as Markie Mark) Head of BBC Radio 1Xtra, and music producer with Panjabi Hit Squad

Spring Grove Grammar School
 Robert Gurth Hughes, Conservative MP from 1987 to 1997 for Harrow West, and chief executive of the Association of Optometrists, since 2005
 Ian McLagan, musician, including with the rock bands Small Faces and Faces

References

External links
 Lampton School official web site
 Forerunner school (different premises) alumni website – soon to close
 Forerunner school (different premises) historical reference website

News items
 Teacher suspended in 2008

Training schools in England
Academies in the London Borough of Hounslow
Educational institutions established in 1959
Secondary schools in the London Borough of Hounslow
1959 establishments in England